Keeler may refer to:

Places
2261 Keeler, asteroid
Keeler, California, USA
Keeler Township, Michigan, USA
Keeler, Saskatchewan, Canada
Keeler (lunar crater), on the moon
Keeler (Martian crater), crater on Mars
Cape Keeler, cape in Antarctica

Media
Keeler (play), 2013 play about the Profumo affair

People with the surname Keeler
 Anson F. Keeler (1887–1943), mayor of Norwalk, Connecticut (1927–1930), member of the Connecticut Senate (1931), Connecticut State Comptroller (1933–1935)
 Christine Keeler (1942–2017), British model and showgirl
 Edwin O. Keeler (1846–1923), first mayor of Norwalk, Connecticut after the city's incorporation (1893–1894), Lieutenant Governor of Connecticut (1901–1903)
 Ernest Keeler, American pioneer race car driver, participant in 1906 Vanderbilt Elimination Race
 Harry Stephen Keeler, American writer
 Jacqueline Keeler, Native American writer
 James Edward Keeler, American astronomer
 Jesse Keeler, musician, known for his work in Death from Above 1979 and MSTRKRFT
 John Keeler (1654–1717), member of the General Assembly of the Colony of Connecticut from Norwalk in 1698
 Ken Keeler, American comic writer
 Leonarde Keeler, inventor of the polygraph
 Ralph Keeler (1613–1672), founding settler of Norwalk, Connecticut and ancestor of most American people with the surname Keeler
 Ruby Keeler, Canadian actress
 Samuel Keeler (1656–1713), founding settler of Ridgefield, Connecticut and member of the House of Representatives of the Colony of Connecticut from Norwalk 
 Sarah Warren Keeler (1844-1899), American educator of the deaf-mute
 William Henry Keeler (1931–2017), American Catholic archbishop and cardinal
 W. W. Keeler, Chief of the Cherokee Nation, president of Philips Petroleum
 Willie Keeler, Major League Baseball player
 Jennifer Keeler-Milne, Australian artist

See also
 includes other persons with the surname
 Keillor (surname), a surname
 Keiller (disambiguation), a surname
 Kieler (disambiguation)
 Garrison Keillor, of A Prairie Home Companion